Same-sex marriage in Rhode Island has been legally recognized since August 1, 2013. The state had authorized a limited form of domestic partnerships from 2002 to 2011, and the formation of civil unions from 2011 until the state began recognizing same-sex marriages in 2013. Rhode Island was the last state in New England to legalize same-sex marriage.

Legal history 
Same-sex marriage was first debated in the 1990s, but faced fierce opposition from the Catholic Church, which is influential in the state as Rhode Island has the highest proportion of Catholic residents of any state in the United States. Despite political opposition, Rhode Island began allowing unregistered domestic partnerships in 2002 that provided a small number of legal benefits to same-sex couples. For example, the surviving spouse in such a partnership, if a police officer, fire fighter, or correctional officer, could receive a death benefit. Domestic partners could adjust their state taxes to reflect the costs of health insurance premiums, and could control the funeral arrangements of a deceased partner. This status became inactive with the state's adoption of civil unions.

In February 2007, Attorney General Patrick C. Lynch issued an opinion advising that same-sex marriages performed in Massachusetts be recognized in Rhode Island. He said that "his interpretation permitted recognition of the marriages, although he acknowledged that it was just an opinion and did not have the force of law." The Human Rights Campaign noted that "This is not a binding opinion and the attorney general noted that this question will most likely be answered by the courts."

Court rulings
In September 2006, Massachusetts Superior Court Justice Thomas E. Connolly ruled that same-sex couples who live in Rhode Island can marry in Massachusetts. The ruling was a response to a 1913 law that prohibited Massachusetts from performing marriages that were not legal in the couple's home state. The ruling did not affect the status of such marriages in Rhode Island.

In December 2007, the Rhode Island Supreme Court held, in a 3–2 opinion, that the state's Family Court lacks jurisdiction to hear a divorce petition involving a same-sex couple who were married in Massachusetts. Justice William P. Robinson III wrote the majority opinion, joined by Chief Justice Frank J. Williams and Justice Frank Flaherty. Justice Paul Suttell's dissent was joined by Justice Maureen McKenna Goldberg.<ref>{{cite web|url=http://www.courts.ri.gov/supreme/pdf-files/06-340-12-07-07.pdf|title=Chambers v. Ormiston, 935 A.2d 956 (R.I. 2007)|work=Rhode Island Supreme Court|archive-url=https://web.archive.org/web/20091224091535/http://www.courts.ri.gov/supreme/pdf-files/06-340-12-07-07.pdf|archive-date=December 24, 2009}}</ref>

Civil unions
Civil union licenses were issued by the state of Rhode Island between July 1, 2011 and August 1, 2013. Civil unions provided couples with almost all of the rights and benefits of marriage under state law. Same-sex couples could however not access the federal benefits of marriage until the Defense of Marriage Act (DOMA) was struck down by the U.S. Supreme Court in United States v. Windsor'' on June 26, 2013.

In 2001, there was an attempt (similar to Vermont's civil union law) to create civil unions under Rhode Island's domestic relations statutes. Any Rhode Island law applying to marriages would have also applied to the newly created civil unions. The bill was introduced to the Rhode Island House of Representatives, but the Judiciary Committee defeated it.

In May 2011, a bill to legalize civil unions was introduced to the Rhode Island General Assembly. On May 19, 2011, the bill passed the House of Representatives by a vote of 62–11, with two representatives not voting. The Senate then passed the bill on a vote of 21–16 on June 29. Governor Lincoln Chafee signed the legislation on July 2, 2011, and it retroactively took effect as of July 1, 2011. The legislation included extensive and controversial exemptions that allowed any religiously affiliated organization or institution, such as schools, universities and hospitals, to deny recognition of spouses in a civil union, which made it unpopular with advocates of same-sex marriage. Participation in civil unions was very low. As of February 2012, only 46 couples had established civil unions. On August 1, 2013, when the state began offering same-sex marriage, it stopped offering civil unions, though it continues to recognize existing ones.

Same-sex marriage
Bills to legalize same-sex marriage were first proposed in 1998. In 2004, Representative Arthur Handy and Senator Rhoda Perry introduced same-sex marriage legislation to the General Assembly. Perry's bill had four co-sponsors, and Handy's bill had 11 House co-sponsors. Both the House and Senate judiciary committees held hearings on the marriage bills, but neither took any action. Handy and Perry reintroduced their bills in 2005 with more co-sponsors, including two Republican lawmakers. In early 2011, legislation to legalize same-sex marriage was introduced to the General Assembly. Governor Lincoln Chafee, an independent at the time, had previously indicated that he would sign such legislation if it were approved by the Assembly. In April 2011, the legislation stalled due to lack of support in the Assembly, and contentious debate.

On May 14, 2012, Governor Chafee signed an executive order recognizing out-of-state same-sex marriages.

On January 3, 2013, Representative Arthur Handy and Senator Donna Nesselbush introduced legislation to legalize same-sex marriage. The House version had 42 out of 75 members as sponsors, while the Senate version had 11 out of 38 senators. On January 7, the Roman Catholic Bishop of Providence, Thomas Tobin, called the legislation "immoral and unnecessary" and recommended a referendum over enacting same-sex marriage by statute. Governor Chafee said on January 11 that he would probably veto such a referendum. The Episcopal Bishop of Rhode Island, Nicholas Knisely, said he was "eager to see our state legislature join many others across the country in passing legislation to ensure civil marriage equality."

The House Judiciary Committee approved the legislation unanimously on January 22. The House passed the bill on a 51–19 vote two days later. The Rhode Island Council of Churches endorsed the legislation on January 31. On April 23, all 5 Republican state senators announced their support for the legislation—the first time a party's caucus in a state legislature had supported same-sex marriage unanimously—and the Senate Judiciary Committee approved the legislation in a 7–4 vote, while defeating a proposal to present the issue to voters as a referendum. On April 24, the Rhode Island Senate passed an amended version of the bill by a 26–12 vote. On April 30, the House Judiciary Committee unanimously approved the amended legislation. The House passed the legislation on May 2 on a vote of 56 to 15, and Chafee signed it into law the same day. Bishop Tobin reiterated his opposition the same day and wrote a letter to Rhode Island Catholics that said "homosexual acts are ... always sinful" and advised that "Catholics should examine their consciences very carefully before deciding whether or not to endorse same-sex relationships or attend same-sex ceremonies. To do so might harm their relationship with God."

The legislation took effect on August 1, 2013, with the first marriage licenses issued to same-sex couples when offices opened at 8:30 a.m. that day. The first couple to be issued a license in Providence were Gary McDowell and Zachary Marcus, who filed marriage paperwork at Providence City Hall shortly after 8:30 a.m. on August 1. The definition of marriage in Rhode Island law is now the following:

Public opinion 
An independent poll conducted by Brown University in May 2009 showed that 60 percent of Rhode Islanders supported legalizing same-sex marriage, while 31 percent opposed doing so. Various polls have been commissioned by participants in the same-sex marriage debate, including by the Rhode Island chapter of the Gay & Lesbian Advocates & Defenders and the National Organization for Marriage (NOM), which opposes same-sex marriage. The poll results reflect different question wording and sampling, with NOM's polls generally showing far weaker support for same-sex marriage than other polls.

Slightly less than half of Rhode Islanders are Catholic. A survey by Greenberg Quinlan Rosner Research for the Rhode Island Marriage Coalition in August 2010 showed that 63 percent of Catholics supported same-sex marriage provided it did not infringe on the church's right to choose whom it marries.

A poll from Public Policy Polling conducted in January 2013 found that 57 percent of Rhode Island voters supported the legalization of same-sex marriage and 36 percent opposed legalization. Given other options, 31 percent preferred civil unions to marriage and 13 percent opposed all forms of legal recognition for same-sex relationships. A survey conducted by the Taubman Center for Public Policy at Brown University on February 21–23, 2013 found that 60.4 percent of Rhode Island voters supported same-sex marriage, while 26.1 percent were opposed.

2015 and 2016 polls from the Public Religion Research Institute (PRRI) found that 69 percent and 67 percent of respondents in Rhode Island supported same-sex marriage, respectively. In 2017, the PRRI placed support for same-sex marriage at 78 percent, with 17 percent opposed and 5 percent undecided. A PRRI survey conducted between March 8 and November 9, 2021 showed that 82% of Rhode Island respondents supported same-sex marriage, while 17% opposed and 1% were undecided. This level of support was similar to neighboring New England states, including Massachusetts at 85% and Connecticut and Vermont at 77%.

See also 
 LGBT rights in Rhode Island
 Same-sex marriage in the United States

References 

Rhode Island law
LGBT in Rhode Island
2013 in LGBT history
Rhode Island
2013 in Rhode Island